Tillandsia gardneri is a species in the genus Tillandsia. This species is native to Trinidad & Tobago, Colombia, eastern Brazil (as far south as Rio Grande do Sul) and Venezuela.

Cultivars
 Tillandsia 'Feather Duster'
 Tillandsia 'Gardicta'
 Tillandsia 'Quicksilver'
 Tillandsia 'Tropic Skye'

References

gardneri
Flora of South America
Flora of Trinidad and Tobago
Plants described in 1842